Dragutin Ivanić was an Independent State of Croatia army lieutenant who served in the 15.(Kroatische)/JG 52 and who was mistakenly credited with 18 air victories during World War II.

References

Croatian World War II pilots